Our Party may refer to: 

OUR Party (Ownership, Unity and Responsibility Party), a political party in the Solomon Islands
Uri Party, a defunct liberal political party in South Korea
Our Party (Bosnia and Herzegovina), a political party in Bosnia-Herzegovina
 Our Party (Moldova)